4015 Wilson–Harrington is an active asteroid known both as comet 107P/Wilson–Harrington and as asteroid 4015 Wilson–Harrington. It will pass  from Earth on 20 July 2022 and then pass perihelion (closest approach to the Sun) on 24 August 2022. It seldom gets brighter than apparent magnitude 16.

This near-Earth object is considered both an Apollo asteroid with the designation 4015 Wilson–Harrington and a periodic comet known as Comet Wilson–Harrington or 107P/Wilson–Harrington. It was initially discovered in 1949 as a comet and then lost to further observations. Thirty years later it was rediscovered as an asteroid, after which it took over a decade to determine that these observations were of the same object. Therefore, it has both a comet designation and an asteroid designation, and with a name length of 17 characters it is currently the asteroid with the longest name, having one more character than the 16-character limit imposed by the IAU.

The comet was discovered on 19 November 1949, by Albert G. Wilson and Robert G. Harrington at Palomar Observatory. Only three photographic observations were obtained and the comet was lost (insufficient observations to determine a precise enough orbit to know where to look for future appearances of the comet.)

On 15 November 1979, an apparent Mars-crosser asteroid was found by Eleanor F. Helin, also of Palomar Observatory. It received the designation 1979 VA, and when re-observed on 20 December 1988, received the permanent number 4015.

On 13 August 1992, it was reported that asteroid (4015) 1979 VA and comet 107P/Wilson–Harrington were the same object. By then, enough observations of the asteroid had accumulated to obtain a fairly precise orbit, and the search of old photographic plates for prediscovery images turned up the 1949 plates with the images of the lost comet.

Although the 1949 images show cometary features, all subsequent images show only a stellar image, suggesting it might be an inactive comet that undergoes only infrequent outbursts.

The eccentricity is 0.624, which is somewhat higher than that of a typical asteroid-belt minor planet and more typical of periodic comets.  Its Minimum Orbit Intersection Distance (MOID) of less than 0.05 AU and its large size make it a potentially hazardous asteroid (PHA).

As a dual status object, astrometric observations of 4015 Wilson–Harrington should be reported under the minor planet designation.

A flyby of 4015 Wilson–Harrington was formerly planned by Deep Space 1. It was also considered for the NEAR mission.

See also
 Marco Polo (spacecraft)
 List of asteroids visited by spacecraft

References

External links 
 Cometography.com: Wilson–Harrington
 107P/(4015) Wilson-Harrington – Seiichi Yoshida @ aerith.net
 
 

004015
004015
004015
107P
0107
004015
Discoveries by Eleanor F. Helin
Named minor planets
004015
19791115